Dmitry Marshin (born as Dzmitri Marshyn, 15 September 1972 in Mogilev) is an Azerbaijani athlete of Belarusian descent. He competed for Azerbaijan in hammer throw at the 2012 Summer Olympics, finishing in 20th in the qualifying round and not qualifying for the final.  His personal best is a throw of 79.56 in 2012.

In 2015 Marshin was suspended for four years after he failed a drug test.

References

1972 births
Living people
Azerbaijani male hammer throwers
Athletes (track and field) at the 2012 Summer Olympics
Olympic athletes of Azerbaijan
People from Mogilev
World Athletics Championships athletes for Azerbaijan
Doping cases in athletics
Azerbaijani sportspeople in doping cases
Azerbaijani people of Belarusian descent
Islamic Solidarity Games competitors for Azerbaijan
Olympic male hammer throwers
21st-century Azerbaijani people